A dress is a garment consisting of a skirt with an attached bodice or with a matching bodice giving the effect of a one-piece garment.
Dress may also refer to:

Attire
 Clothing in general
 Costume, fancy dress
 Standard diving dress, the old heavy canvas diving suit with a large metal helmet
 To dress a set, in film or theater production

Music
 Dress (Shizuka Kudo album), 1997
 Dress (Sophie Villy album), 2014
 "Dress" (PJ Harvey song), 1991
 "Dress" (Buck-Tick song), 1993
 "Dress" (Taylor Swift song), 2017

Surname 
 Andreas Dress (born 1938), German mathematician
  (born 1947), French actress

Other
 Dress (film), an award-winning short film
 DRESS syndrome, Drug Rash (or Reaction) with Eosinophilia and Systemic Symptoms, also known as Drug Hypersensitivity Syndrome

See also
 
 
 Dres (Polish subculture), a term used in Poland to describe a specific subculture or class of young males
 Dresch, a French motorcycle manufacturer
 The Dress (disambiguation)
 Dressing (disambiguation)
 Dresser (disambiguation)
 Drees
 List of individual dresses